The Alvernia Matriculation Higher Secondary School (AMHSS)  in Coimbatore, Tamil Nadu, India is an educational institution under the government of Tamil Nadu. It was started by  the sisters of the Franciscan Clarist Congregation, followers of St. Francis of Assisi and his follower St. Clare. The school motto is Per Aspera ad Astra (Success through difficulties).

Rev. Sr. Celina is the Principal.

Founding
The spade work for a Matriculation School was initiated by Rt. Rev. Dr. George Alapatt, the then Bishop of Trichur, Rev. Mother Alberta and her councilors, the then governing body of province. The pioneer sisters, Sr. Annie Xavier, Sr. Melita, Sr. Anna Clara, Sr. Harold, Sr. Adelaide and Mrs. Barbara John rented a house in June 1966 at Ramanathapuram, Coimbatore and started the school with seven students. Alvernia moved to the present site on 2 April 1967.

Timeline
 1966 - 20 June - School started.
 1969 - 23 June - Recognition of the school.
 1973 - First batch of students pass out.
 1973 - Home for the aged started.
 1978 - Upgraded to Higher Secondary.
 1983 - Then Principal Rev. Sr. Jane Frances was given the State award for the best teacher.
 1984 - Retirement of Rev. Sr. Jane Frances. Rev. Sr. Adelaide takes over as Principal. 
 1991 - Silver Jubilee year.

Facilities
 Matriculation syllabus
 Kindergarten up to HSLC
 School bus 
 School library
 2 playgrounds
 Science laboratory

Student activities
 Piano and music class
 Arts, Literary and Science student clubs
 Yoga training
 karate training
 Basketball team
 Annual sports event
 Annual Cultural competition and school day celebrations

Philanthropic activities
 To serve the poor and nurse the sick the school houses an old age home started in 1973. It shelters 25 destitutes. The school arranges an annual voluntary visit to this home by the students to serve the emotional needs of the home residents and at the same time to develop compassion in the young generation.
 The school trains unemployed women from the locality in tailoring classes, to enable a livelihood.
 Adult education is carried on at Sjiastry Nagar, Karamadai, by the convent sisters.

Address
 Ramanathapuram, Trichy Road,
 Coimbatore 641045.

References

External links
 School website

Franciscan high schools
Catholic secondary schools in India
Christian schools in Tamil Nadu
Primary schools in Tamil Nadu
High schools and secondary schools in Tamil Nadu
Schools in Coimbatore
Educational institutions established in 1966
1966 establishments in Madras State